The 2015 British Academy Scotland New Talent Awards were held on 9 April 2015 at The Arches (Glasgow). Presented by BAFTA Scotland, the accolades honour the best upcoming talent in the field of film and television in Scotland. The nominees were announced on 24 March 2015. The ceremony was hosted by Muriel Gray.

Winners and nominees

Winners are listed first and highlighted in boldface.
{| class=wikitable
|-
! style="background:#EEDD82; width:50%" | Best Actor
! style="background:#EEDD82; width:50%" | Best Actress
|-
| valign="top" |
Nick Ikunda - Happy Together
Lewis Baxter - Tide
Darren Connell - Scot Squad
| valign="top" |
Hannah Ord - Last Night in Edinburgh
 Georgia Raymond – A Love Divided
 Ashley Smith – Scot Squad
|-
! style="background:#EEDD82; width:50%" | Best Drama
! style="background:#EEDD82; width:50%" | Best Entertainment
|-
| valign="top" |
Patata Tortilla
Last Night in Edinburgh
 The Scribbler
| valign="top" |
The Wee 'Hings
 The Cyclist
 Middle Man
|-
! style="background:#EEDD82; width:50%" | Best Writer
! style="background:#EEDD82; width:50%" | Best Editor
|-
| valign="top" |
Ben Sharrock - Patata Tortilla
 Gillian Park – Flotsam James Price - Dropping Off Michael
| valign="top" |Benjamin Cook - The Scribbler Ally Bhatia - Waitress
 Artur Zaremba -Our Father
|-
! style="background:#EEDD82; width:50%" | Best Factual
! style="background:#EEDD82; width:50%" | Best Camera / Photography
|-
| valign="top" |Marty Goes To Hollywood – Martyn Robertson, Ian Bustard After The Crash - Tomasz Motyka
 Late Night in Glasgow – Kurosh Kani, Dayna Baptie, Louise Dawson
| valign="top" |Steven Cameron Ferguson - Sick Ian Forbes – Seahorse
 Andrew O'Connor – The Still Heart Beating
|-
! style="background:#EEDD82; width:50%" | Best Sound
! style="background:#EEDD82; width:50%" | Best Composer
|-
| valign="top" |Kevin Walls – Identical Richy Carey - Phonic Imagery
 Chris Gayne – Anna
| valign="top" |Richy Carey - Lichtspiel: Opus I Amin Keshmiri – The Scribbler
 Alia E. Torrie – When the Tide Comes In
|-
! style="background:#EEDD82; width:50%" | Best Design
! style="background:#EEDD82; width:50%" | Best Animation
|-
| valign="top" |Anthony Devine - Boat Marina Maclean - Waitress
 Frances Collier - Whistle My Lad
| valign="top" |Domestic Appliances - Lewis Firth Bolton Mitigating Circumstances - Kieran Duncan, Tom Paxton, Steph Flynn, Phillip Vaughan
 Separate Lives - Mayra Hernandez Rios, Jared Taylor, Aleksandra Kovač
|-
! style="background:#EEDD82; width:50%" | Best Game
|-
| valign="top" |Seek - Vimarsh Raina, Amy Stevens, Jessica Hider, Christopher Dickson'''
 Leila And The Little Folk - Bruce Lomond
 Revenant - Stuart Tait, Ellen Brown, Mark Thompson, Vince Finlayson
|}

Special Award for New Work
Steven Cameron Ferguson - Sick''

See also
2015 British Academy Scotland Awards

References

External links
BAFTA Scotland Home page

New Talent
British Academy Scotland
British Academy Scotland New Talent Awards
British Academy Scotland New Talent Awards, 2015
British Academy Scotland New Talent Awards 
British Academy Scotland New Talent Awards
British Academy Scotland New Talent Awards
BAFTA Scotland New Talent
British Academy Scotland New Talent Awards